Summertime is a 2016 Italian comedy film directed by Gabriele Muccino.

Cast
 Brando Pacitto as Marco
 Matilda Lutz as Maria
 Taylor Frey as Matt
 Joey Haro as Paul
 Timothy Martin as Ken
 Jessica Rothe as Jules
 Tatiana Luter as Amy
 Laura Cayouette as Paul's Mom
 Scott Bakula as Paul's Father

References

External links 

2016 films
2016 drama films
Italian drama films
English-language Italian films
Films directed by Gabriele Muccino
2010s English-language films
2010s Italian films